Walter Jakob "Joki" Freund (September 5, 1926, Höchst, Frankfurt am MainFebruary 15, 2012, Schwalbach am Taunus) was a German jazz saxophonist.

Freund began playing the accordion as a child, switching to tenor saxophone after World War II ended. Early in the postwar era, he played with Joe Quitter, Carlo Bohlander, Gerry Weinkopf, Joe Klimm, and Jutta Hipp, then formed his own ensemble. He began performing with American musicians, including Donald Byrd, Art Taylor, and Doug Watkins, during their European festival appearances. He played with, and arranged for, Albert Mangelsdorff in the jazz orchestra of Hessischer Rundfunk and Erwin Lehn in the Süddeutscher Rundfunk orchestra. He played with the Frankfurt Jazz Ensemble on soprano saxophone in the 1970s, also performing as a leader around this time.

References
Heidi Boulton, "Joki Freund". The New Grove Dictionary of Jazz, 2nd edn.

External links
Freund's works catalogued in the German National Library

1926 births
2012 deaths
German jazz saxophonists
Male saxophonists
20th-century saxophonists
20th-century German musicians
Musicians from Frankfurt
20th-century German male musicians
German male jazz musicians